Trödelsteine refers to the following geographical features near Emmerzhausen in the German state of Rhineland-Palatinate:

 Trödelsteine (mountain) (613.0 m)
 Trödelsteine (rock formation), rock formation and natural monument